James Morrison or Morison may refer to:

Arts and entertainment 
 Jim Morrison (James Douglas Morrison, 1943–1971), lead singer of The Doors
 James Morrison (Geordie songwriter) (1800–1830), Newcastle songwriter
 James W. Morrison (1888–1974), American actor in the 1911 film A Tale of Two Cities
 James Morrison (fiddler) (1891–1947), Irish fiddler
 James Morrison (artist) (1932–2020), Scottish artist, co-founder of the Glasgow Group of artists
 James Morrison (actor) (born 1954), American actor
 James Neil Morrison (born 1960), aka Jim Bob, English guitarist and member of Carter USM
 James Morrison (jazz musician) (born 1962), Australian jazz musician
 James Morrison (singer) (born 1984), English singer and songwriter
 Jamie Morrison (born 1984), British rock drummer in Stereophonics, Noisettes
 Jim Morrison, host of American talk show For & Against

Politics and law 
 James Morrison (businessman) (1789–1857), British businessman and politician
 James L. D. Morrison (1816–1888), American politician from Illinois
 James Morrison (Western Australia) (1846–1927), Australian businessman and politician
 James J. Morrison (1861–1936), Canadian farm leader
 James Morrison (British politician) (1873–1934), British landowner and MP for Nottingham East
 James H. Morrison (1908–2000), American politician from Louisiana
 James Morrison, 2nd Baron Margadale (1930–2003), British peer
 James Morrison (Kansas politician) (1942–2010), American politician from Kansas
 James Morrison (Indiana politician) (1796-1869), American politician from Indiana

Religion
 James Morison (evangelical) (1816–1893), founder of the Scottish evangelical union
 James Dow Morrison (1844–1934), American episcopal bishop of Duluth
 James Morrison (bishop) (1861–1950), Canadian Roman Catholic bishop of the Diocese of Antigonish, Nova Scotia

Science and medicine 
 James Morison (physician) (1770–1840), British physician
 James Rutherford Morison (1853–1939), British surgeon
 Jim Morrison (chemist) (1924–2013), Scottish-born Australian physical chemist

Sports 
 James L. Morrison (fl. 1890s), American college football player and coach at Notre Dame, Hillsdale, Knox, and Illinois College
 James Morrison (American football) (1871–1939), American college football player and coach at TCU and VPI
 Jim Morrison (hurler) (born 1923), Irish hurler
 Jim Morrison (ice hockey) (born 1931), Canadian ice hockey player, coach, and scout
 James Morrison (cricketer) (born 1936), New Zealand cricketer
 J. J. Dillon (James Morrison, born 1942), American professional wrestler
 Jim Morrison (baseball) (born 1952), American Major League Baseball player
 James Morrison (golfer) (born 1985), English golfer
 James Morrison (footballer) (born 1986), Scottish pro footballer, West Bromwich Albion
 James Morrison (boxer) (born 1990), American boxer, son of late Tommy Morrison

Others 
 James Morrison (mutineer) (1760–1807), British seaman and mutineer
 Richard James Morrison (1795–1874), English astrologer
 James M. Morrison (1805–1880), American banker
 James Augustus Cotter Morison (1832–1888), English essayist and historian
 James Morrison, Scottish founder of mobile phone firm i-mate